Williams Brothers may refer to:

 The Williams Brothers (1938–1990s), an American singing quartet, including Andy Williams
 The Williams Brothers (gospel group)
 Williams Bros Brewing Co, Alloa, Clackmannanshire, Scotland
 Williams Companies, an American energy company originally called Williams Brothers
 Williams sisters, are two professional American tennis players